Halef Silva Melo (born 20 August 1994), commonly known as Halef Pitbull, is a Brazilian footballer who currently plays as a forward.

Career statistics

Club

Notes

References

External links

1994 births
Living people
Brazilian footballers
Brazilian expatriate footballers
Association football forwards
Clube Desportivo Sete de Setembro players
Cruzeiro Esporte Clube players
Santa Cruz Futebol Clube players
Ipatinga Futebol Clube players
Mito HollyHock players
São Bernardo Futebol Clube players
Jeddah Club players
J2 League players
Saudi First Division League players
Brazilian expatriate sportspeople in Portugal
Brazilian expatriate sportspeople in Japan
Brazilian expatriate sportspeople in Saudi Arabia
Expatriate footballers in Portugal
Expatriate footballers in Japan
Expatriate footballers in Saudi Arabia
ReinMeer Aomori players